Robin Morton Gill (born 18 July 1944) is a British Anglican priest, theologian, and academic, specialising in Christian ethics. Since 2012, he has been canon theologian of the Cathedral of the Holy Trinity, Gibraltar: he was acting dean from 2017 to 2020. He was William Leech Professor in Applied Theology at the University of Newcastle (1988–1992), and was then Michael Ramsey Professor of Modern Theology (1992–2011) and Professor of Applied Theology (2011–2014) at the University of Kent. He has also served as a parish priest in the Church of England and the Scottish Episcopal church, serving in the dioceses of Coventry, of Edinburgh, of Newcastle, and of Canterbury.

Early life and education
Gill was born on 18 July 1944. He was educated at Westminster School, an all-boys public school within the precincts of Westminster Abbey. He studied theology and trained for holy orders at King's College, London, graduating with a Bachelor of Divinity (BD) degree and the Associateship of King's College (AKC) in 1966. He remained at King's to undertake postgraduate research, and completed his Doctor of Philosophy (PhD) degree in 1969. He later studied at the University of Birmingham, graduating with a Master of Social Sciences (MSocSc) degree in 1972.

Career
Gill was ordained in the Church of England as a deacon in 1968 and as a priest in 1969. From 1968 to 1971, he served his curacy at St Andrew's Church, Rugby in the Diocese of Coventry. From 1971 to 1972, he was a lecturer at Newton Theological College in Papua New Guinea. In 1972, he joined the University of Edinburgh as a lecturer in Christian ethics. Additionally, he was priest-in-charge of St Philip's and St James', Edinburgh from 1973 to 1975 in the Diocese of Edinburgh and priest-in-charge of the Church of St Michael and All Angels, Ford, Northumberland from 1975 to 1987 in the Diocese of Newcastle. He served as associate dean of Edinburgh's faculty of theology from 1985 to 1988. He was promoted to senior lecturer in 1986.

In 1988, Gill was appointed William Leech Research Professor/Professorial Fellow in Applied Theology at the University of Newcastle. He was also priest-in-charge of St Mary and All Souls, Coldstream, in the Diocese of Edinburgh during this time. In 1992, he moved to the University of Kent having been appointed the first Michael Ramsey Professor of Modern Theology. He was made an Honorary Provincial Canon of Canterbury Cathedral in 1992. He served as Chair of the Archbishop of Canterbury's Medical Ethics Advisory Group between 1993 and 2006. From 1997 to 1998, he was a theological consultant at the 1998 Lambeth Conference. From 2003 to 2011, he was additionally an honorary priest-in-charge of All Saints Church, Hollingbourne in the Diocese of Canterbury. He stepped down as Michael Ramsey Professor in 2011 and was appointed Professor of Applied Theology.

On 4 November 2012, Gill was installed as canon theologian of the Cathedral of the Holy Trinity, Gibraltar in the Diocese in Europe. He retired from the University of Kent in 2014 and was appointed emeritus professor. He has held permission to officiate in the 
Diocese of Canterbury since 2014. From 2017 to 2020, he was Acting Dean of Gibraltar Cathedral.

Views
Gill has expressed support for partial-decriminalisation of assisted suicide so that people would not be prosecuted for helping end the lives of their terminally ill relatives, stating in 2005 that "There is a very strong compassionate case for voluntary euthanasia". In a submission to the Select Committee on Science and Technology in 2007, he stated that he supports a gradualist approach to abortions in that early abortions are preferable to late abortions and the limit should be the point of foetal viability (22 weeks): "In terms of the gradualist position it would be consistent to reduce both the upper limit for abortions and the procedures that may be delaying first trimester abortions unnecessarily."

Personal life
In 1967, Gill married Jennifer Margaret Sheppard. Together they have two children: one son and one daughter.

Selected works

References

1944 births
Living people
20th-century Anglican theologians
21st-century Anglican theologians
British Anglican theologians
20th-century Anglican priests
21st-century Anglican priests
Practical theologians
Christian ethicists
Academics of the University of Kent
People educated at Westminster School, London
Alumni of King's College London
Alumni of the University of Birmingham
Associates of King's College London
Academics of the University of Edinburgh
Church of England priests
Scottish Episcopalian priests
Deans of Gibraltar
People from Ford, Northumberland